KK ABS Primorje is a professional basketball club from Herceg Novi, Montenegro. The team currently competes in First Erste League. A school for all ages and categories has been organized within the club.

ABS Primorje